The Spanish brig Vivo, of the Spanish Royal Navy, was launched at Cadiz in 1794 (or possibly 1788).

On 30 September 1800  captured the Spanish naval brig , of fourteen 18-pounder carronades and with a crew of 100 men. She was two days out of Ferrol and carrying dispatches and orders to America. She threw the dispatches, etc., overboard during the chase. The Spanish brig "Vida", from Ferrol and prize to Fisgard, arrived at Plymouth on 9 October. She was immediately laid up in ordinary. The British Royal Navy named and registered her, but never commissioned her.  The "Principal officers and commissioners of His Majesty's Navy" offered El Vroo for sale on 24 August 1801. She sold on 7 September for £865 or £860.

Notes

Citations

References
 

1794 ships
Ships built in Spain
Ships of the Spanish Navy
Captured ships
Brigs of the Royal Navy